Pretty Little Liars is a multimedia franchise consisting of two book series, four television series and one web series. The initial novel of the same name was first published in 2006.

The first television series also entitled Pretty Little Liars began airing on ABC Family in June 2010; meanwhile, additional books continued to be published. Pretty Dirty Secrets, a web series was released on ABC Family's website in the fall of 2012 alongside the third season of Pretty Little Liars. The second series to make it to television, Ravenswood, aired on ABC Family from 2013 to 2014 and was cancelled after one season. Pretty Little Liars later ended and aired its final episode in June 2017.

The first book of The Perfectionists was released in April 2014 and a second book in 2015. A television series for The Perfectionists was developed and later reworked into a spin-off and sequel of Pretty Little Liars with the title Pretty Little Liars: The Perfectionists, which became the third series in the franchise. It aired on Freeform from March to May 2019 and was cancelled after one season.

In 2022, Pretty Little Liars: Original Sin, the fourth series in the franchise premiered on HBO Max.

Literature

Pretty Little Liars

Set in the suburbs of Philadelphia, the book series follows the lives of four teenage girls whose clique falls apart after the disappearance of their queen bee leader, Alison DiLaurentis. Three years after her mysterious disappearance, the girls begin receiving intimidating messages from an anonymous character named "A", who threatens to expose their secrets, including long-forgotten ones they thought only Alison knew. Shortly after the messages begin, Alison's body is discovered buried in her yard. The books progress with the four girls trying to figure out the identity of "A" and facing many dangerous obstacles and twists as they do so.

Pretty Little Liars is a series of young adult novels by Sara Shepard. It consists of 21 books split into 4 arcs of 4 books each, the remaining 5 are made up of short stories and companion novels. The novels have appeared on The New York Times Best Seller list. The franchise has been licensed by Amazon.com's Kindle Worlds range of non-canon ebooks. An audio podcast series titled The Liars, which served as a sequel to the series and was released on Audible on June 16, 2022.

The Perfectionists
The Perfectionists is a series of young adult novels by Sara Shepard. The first book of the same name was released on October 2, 2014. The second novel, and sequel to the first, titled The Good Girls was released on June 2, 2015. Five high school girls jokingly plan the perfect murder for a boy who has hurt them in different manners. When the boy is found dead in the exact way they thought, the girls become prime suspects and start a quest to find the real murderer. A television adaption for the series had been in the works at The CW since 2013, but the rights were later sold to Freeform.

Television
Four television series, including one made for web, make up the bulk of the Pretty Little Liars franchise: Pretty Little Liars, Pretty Dirty Secrets, Ravenswood, and Pretty Little Liars: The Perfectionists. The four series in total amount to 152 episodes across 10 seasons of television. A fifth series, Pretty Little Liars: Original Sin, is released in 2022.

Pretty Little Liars (2010–2017)

Pretty Little Liars is an American teen drama mystery thriller television series developed by I. Marlene King and is loosely based on the novel series of the same name. The series follows the lives of four high school girls whose clique falls apart after the disappearance of their leader. One year later, the estranged friends are reunited as they begin receiving messages from a mysterious figure named "A" who threatens to expose their deepest secrets. The series features an ensemble cast, headed by Troian Bellisario as Spencer Hastings, Lucy Hale as Aria Montgomery, Ashley Benson as Hanna Marin, Shay Mitchell as Emily Fields, Sasha Pieterse as Alison DiLaurentis and Janel Parrish as Mona Vanderwaal. The series premiered on June 8, 2010, on ABC Family, and ended on June 27, 2017. The ratings success of the first 10 episodes prompted the book series to be extended beyond the initial eight novels. On August 29, 2016, Freeform confirmed that the series would be ending after its seventh season in 2017. The series finale was viewed by an estimated 1.41 million viewers. It had the second-highest rating of any cable TV series that aired that night.

Pretty Dirty Secrets (2012)

Pretty Dirty Secrets is an American mystery web series from the television series Pretty Little Liars. The web series takes place between the events of the series' third season episodes, "The Lady Killer" and "This Is a Dark Ride". Set in the Rosewood Halloween Spooktacular Store, as the visitors of Rosewood prepared for Halloween.

Ravenswood (2013–2014)

Ravenswood is an American supernatural teen drama, mystery-thriller television series created by I. Marlene King, Oliver Goldstick and Joseph Dougherty. The show aired on ABC Family from October 22, 2013, until February 4, 2014. It is the first spin-off series of Pretty Little Liars and the second series in the franchise. Set in the fictional town of Ravenswood, Pennsylvania, the series follows five strangers whose lives become intertwined by a deadly curse that has plagued their town for generations. They have to dig into the town's dark past to solve the mysterious curse. Starring Nicole Gale Anderson, Tyler Blackburn, Steven Cabral, Brett Dier, Britne Oldford and Merritt Patterson. The series was cancelled due to low ratings after one season.

Pretty Little Liars: The Perfectionists (2019)

Pretty Little Liars: The Perfectionists the third series in the franchise, is an American television series created by I. Marlene King. The series premiered on Freeform on March 20, 2019 and was concluded on May 22, 2019. The series is a sequel to Pretty Little Liars and was loosely based on the novel The Perfectionists by Sara Shepard. It is the second spin-off series of Pretty Little Liars, which will include some of the main characters with Sasha Pieterse and Janel Parrish reprising their roles as Alison DiLaurentis and Mona Vanderwaal, respectively. In a town of Beacon Heights, Washington, where everything seems perfect, from their top-tier college to their overachieving residents and the stress of needing to be perfect leads to the town's first murder. It stars Sofia Carson, Sydney Park, Eli Brown, Hayley Erin, Graeme Thomas King and Kelly Rutherford. Pretty Little Liars: The Perfectionists was cancelled after one season.

Pretty Little Liars: Original Sin (2022–present)

Pretty Little Liars: Original Sin is the fourth series in the franchise, centered around a new cast of characters. Initially announced as a reboot, the series was later confirmed to be taking place within the existing chronology of the previous television series, while introducing new characters and storylines. The premise of the series will see the main characters paying for their parents' sin nearly 20 years ago. The series was first announced as being in development at Warner Bros. for HBO Max in September 2020. With Riverdale creator Roberto Aguirre-Sacasa and Lindsay Calhoon Bring took over as showrunners from I. Marlene King. The series consists of 10 episodes and stars Bailee Madison, Chandler Kinney, Zaria, Malia Pyles, and Maia Reficco.

Cast and characters

Main cast

International adaptations

References

Notes

Citations

ABC Family original programming
Freeform (TV channel) original programming
 
Television franchises
Warner Bros. Television Studios franchises
Mass media franchises introduced in 2006